Zavar may refer to:
 Zavar, Kerman
 Zavar, Jiroft, Kerman Province
 Zavar, Mazandaran
 Zavar, Sistan and Baluchestan